Heavy Juice is an album by saxophonist Houston Person recorded in 1982 and released on the Muse label.

Reception

Allmusic awarded the album 4 stars stating "Virtually all of Houston Person's Muse recordings are easily recommended".

Track listing 
 "Heavy Juice" (Tiny Bradshaw, Red Prysock, Ralph Bass) - 2:46   
 "Summertime" (George Gershwin, DuBose Heyward) - 5:11   
 "Theme from Loveboat"  (Charles Fox, Paul Williams) - 3:57   
 "Never Let Me Go" (Joseph Scott) - 4:34   
 "Let the Feeling Flow" (Peabo Bryson) - 4:04   
 "Please Send Me Someone to Love" (Percy Mayfield) - 5:06  
 "The Texas Shuffle" (Herschel Evans, Edgar Battle) - 2:59   
 "Blue Hue"  (Houston Person) - 3:17

Personnel 
 Houston Person - tenor saxophone 
 Melvin Sparks - guitar (tracks 1,2,3,4,5,6,7)
 Jon Logan - organ (tracks 1,4,6,7)
 David Braham - electric piano, arp string synthesizer (tracks 2,3,5,8)
 Wilbur Bascomb - bass (tracks 2,3,5)
 Billy James - drums (tracks 1,4,6,7)
 Bernard Purdie - drums (tracks 2,3,5)
 Ralph Dorsey - percussion (tracks 2,3,5)
 Horace Ott - arrangement (tracks 3,5)

References 

Houston Person albums
1982 albums
Muse Records albums
Albums arranged by Horace Ott
Albums recorded at Van Gelder Studio